Teemu "Manta Ray" Mäntysaari is a Finnish guitarist.  He was born in Tampere, Finland, in 1987, and began playing guitar at the age of 12.

In 2004, he joined the band Wintersun  and has toured with them since then. He also played for Imperanon until their break-up in 2007. He has written many unreleased songs with Imperanon.

Discography

References

Related links
 Wintersun's page on the Nuclear Blast website
 Imperanon at Myspace

Living people
Finnish heavy metal guitarists
1987 births
21st-century guitarists
Wintersun members